Boatman is a surname. Notable people with the surname include:

Barny Boatman (born 1956), English professional poker player
Jeff Boatman (born 1967), American politician
Michael Boatman (born 1964), American actor
Peter Boatman, former British police officer
Ross Boatman (born 1964), English RADA-trained actor
Shannon Boatman (born 1984), American football player (played in both Canada and US)
Wes Boatman (born ?), American television composer

Occupational surnames
English-language occupational surnames